Robert Clutterbuck (28 June 1772 – 25 May 1831) was an English historian. He spent 18 years writing The History and Antiquities of the County of Hertford.

Life
He was the eldest surviving son of Thomas Clutterbuck, of Watford Hertfordshire by Sarah, daughter of Robert Thurgood of Baldock. He was born at Watford on 28 June 1772, and at an early age was sent to Harrow School. He went to Exeter College, Oxford as a gentleman commoner. After graduating B.A. in 1794 he entered Lincoln's Inn, intending to make the law his profession; but became more interested in chemistry and painting (in which he took lessons from James Barry. In 1798 he married Marianne, eldest daughter of Colonel James Capper, and after a few years living at the seat of his father's in-law, Cathays, near Cardiff, Glamorganshire, he took possession of his paternal estate at Watford. He continued to live there until his death, on 25 May 1831. He was a county magistrate and a Fellow of the Society of Antiquaries.

Works
For 18 years he worked on a new county history; it appeared under the title The History and Antiquities of the County of Hertford; compiled from the best printed authorities and original records preserved in public repositories and private collections. Embellished with views of the most curious monuments of antiquity, and illustrated with a map of the County, 3 vols. London, 1815, 1821, 1827. The plates were in some cases from his own sketches, and he also had the assistance of Edward Blore and other prominent draughtsmen and engravers.

Clutterbuck also published, in 1828, an Account of the Benefactions to the Parish of Watford in the County of Hertford, compiled from Authentic Documents.

References

Attribution

1772 births
1831 deaths
English antiquarians
People educated at Harrow School
Alumni of Christ Church, Oxford
Members of Lincoln's Inn
Fellows of the Society of Antiquaries of London
People from Watford
18th-century English historians
19th-century English historians